Davide Mansi (born 18 January 1996) is an Italian football player. He plays for Eccellenza team FC Costa d'Amalfi.

Club career

Chievo
He joined Chievo before the 2014–15 season and played for their Under-19 squad that season.

Loan to Cavese
He joined Cavese in Serie D on loan for the 2015–16 season.

Loan to Paganese
On 12 August 2018, he signed on a season-long loan with Serie C club Paganese. He made his Serie C debut for Paganese on 9 October 2016 in a game against Melfi as an 82nd-minute substitute for Vincenzo Camilleri. He made just 4 appearances for Paganese throughout the season, 2 of them as a starter.

Loan to Mosta
On 4 September 2017, he joined Maltese Premier League club Mosta on another loan. He received much more playing time at Mosta than at Paganese, starting in most league games, as Mosta finished in 10th place.

Loan to Qormi
On 25 July 2018, he returned to Malta once again, joining Qormi.

Eccellenza
On 2 September 2019, he joined Eccellenza team FC Costa d'Amalfi.

References

External links
 

1996 births
Footballers from Naples
Living people
Italian footballers
Association football defenders
Cavese 1919 players
Paganese Calcio 1926 players
Mosta F.C. players
Qormi F.C. players
Serie C players
Serie D players
Maltese Premier League players
Italian expatriate footballers
Expatriate footballers in Malta